Oliver is a masculine given name of Old French and Medieval British origin. The name has been generally associated with the Latin term olivarius, meaning "olive tree planter", or "olive branch bearer"  Other proposed origins include the Germanic names  "wolf" and  "army"; the Old Norse  Óleifr (Ólaf); a genuinely West Germanic name, perhaps from ala- "all"  and wēra "true" (possibly cognate with Álvaro); the Anglo-Saxon Alfhere; and the Greek name Eleutherios.

Oliver is one of Charlemagne's retainers in the 11th-century Song of Roland. The name was introduced to England by the Normans, where its form was possibly influenced again by its Anglo-Saxon cognate Alfhere. It was commonly used in medieval England, but became rare after the Restoration because of the unpopularity of Oliver Cromwell. The name was revived in the 19th century, possibly inspired by the title character of Charles Dickens' Oliver Twist (1838). Pet forms of the English given name include Ollie and, in medieval times, Noll.

Modern variants include French Olivier, Hungarian Olivér, Irish Oilibhéar or Oilibhéir, Scottish Gaelic Oilvreis, Portuguese Olívio, Italian Oliviero, Spanish Óliver, and Polish Oliwier or Oliwer.

In 2015, Oliver was the most popular given name for boys in Australia. From 2013 to 2017, Oliver was the most popular given name for baby boys born in England.

Variants
 Catalan: 
 French: 
 Hungarian: 
 Irish: , 
 Italian: 
 Māori: 
 Old French: 
 Polish: , 
 Portuguese: 
 Russian: 
 Scottish Gaelic: 
 Spanish: 
 Ukrainian:

People with the given name "Oliver" include

A
Oliver Abildgaard (born 1996), Danish footballer
Oliver Acii (born 1970), Ugandan sprinter
Oliver Ackermann (born 1976), American musician
Oliver Ackland (born 1979), Australian actor
Oliver Acquah (born 1946), Ghanaian footballer
Oliver Adler (born 1967), German footballer
Oliver Agapito (born 1973), Filipino basketball player
Oliver Batali Albino (1935–2020), South Sudanese politician
Oliver Alke (born 1970), German table tennis player
Oliver Allen (disambiguation), multiple people
Oliver Allison (1908–1989), English missionary
Oliver Almond, English priest
Oliver Ames (disambiguation), multiple people
Oliver Anderson (born 1998), Australian tennis player and coach
Oliver Anketell, Irish politician
Oliver Antman (born 2001), Finnish footballer
Oliver Cromwell Applegate (1845–1938), American politician
Oliver Aquino (born 1989), Filipino actor
Oliver Vernon Aplin (1858–1940), British ornithologist
Oliver Arblaster (born 2004), English footballer
Oliver Arms (born 1970), American painter
Oliver Rendell Arton (1916–2011), Bermudian banker
Oliver Askew (born 1996), Swedish-American race car driver
Oliver F. Atkins (1917–1977), American photographer
Oliver August, English corporate executive
Oliver Augustini (born 1990), Slovakian footballer
Oliver L. Austin (1903–1988), American ornithologist
Oliver R. Avison (1860–1959), Canadian doctor
Oliver Axnick (born 1970), German curler

B
Oliver Babic (born 1994), Danish badminton player
Oliver Backhouse (1875–1943), English naval officer
Oliver Badman (1885–1977), Australian politician
Oliver Bailey (born 1982), English cricketer
Oliver Baker (1856–1939), English painter
Oliver Keith Baker (born 1959), American physicist
Oliver Balch, British author
Oliver Baldwin (1899–1958), British politician
Oliver Barbosa (born 1986), Filipino chess grandmaster
Oliver Barclay (1919–2013), British academic
Oliver Barnett (born 1966), American football player
Oliver Barrett (disambiguation), multiple people
Oliver Barth (born 1979), German footballer
Oliver Batchelor (born 1996), English cricketer
Oliver Bäte (born 1965), German corporate executive
Oliver Battcock (1903–1970), English cricketer
Oliver Bauchau, American aerospace engineer
Oliver Baumann (born 1990), German footballer
Oliver Bearman (born 2005), British racing driver
Oliver Beeck (born 1988), American football player
Oliver Beer (disambiguation), multiple people
Oliver Bekker (born 1984), South African golfer
Oliver Bell (born 2004), American actor
Oliver Belmont (1858–1908), American socialite
Oliver Baez Bendorf (born 1987), American poet
Oliver Bendt (born 1946), German singer
Oliver Bengough (born 1975), British entrepreneur
Oliver Benítez (born 1991), Argentinian footballer
Oliver Bennett (born 1992), British racing driver
Oliver Bennett (cricketer) (1889–1977), Trinidadian cricketer
Oliver Berg (born 1993), Norwegian footballer
Olivér Berkes (born 1992), Hungarian singer-songwriter
Oliver Bernard (1925–2013), English poet
Oliver Percy Bernard (1881–1939), English architect
Oliver Berntzon (born 1993), Swedish racing driver
Oliver F. Berry (1908–1991), American military officer
Oliver Bertram (1910–1975), English racing driver
Oliver Bevan (born 1941), English artist
Oliver Bias (born 2001), German footballer
Oliver Bierhoff (born 1968), German footballer
Oliver Mowat Biggar (1876–1948), Canadian lawyer
Oliver Biles (born 1990), British actor
Oliver Bimber (born 1973), German computer scientist
Oliver Bjerrehuus (born 1975), Danish model
Oliver Bjerrum Jensen (born 2002), Danish footballer
Oliver Bjorkstrand (born 1995), Danish ice hockey player
Oliver Blake (1802–1873), Canadian businessman
Oliver Blume (born 1968), German corporate executive
Oliver Boberg (born 1965), German artist
Oliver Bocking (born 1996), English cricketer
Óliver Bocos (born 1982), Spanish footballer
Oliver Bodington (1859–1936), English barrister
Oliver Bogner (born 1993), American television producer
Oliver Bohm (born 1992), Swedish ice hockey player
Oliver Bond (1760–1798), Irish merchant
Oliver James Bond (1865–1933), American educator
Oliver Bone (born 1981), Canadian sailor
Oliver Boot (born 1979), English actor
Oliver Bosbyshell (1839–1921), American soldier and politician
Oliver Bowen (1942–2000), Canadian engineer
Oliver Bowles (??–1646), English minister
Oliver Bozanic (born 1989), Australian footballer
Oliver Braddick (1944–2022), British psychologist
Oliver Bradwell (born 1992), American sprinter
Oliver Ernesto Branch (1847–1916), American politician
Oliver Winslow Branch (1879–1956), associate justice of the New Hampshire Supreme Court
Oliver Brennand (born 1986), English rugby union footballer
Oliver Sylvain Baliol Brett (1881–1963), British politician
Oliver Bright Jr., Liberian politician
Oliver Bromby (born 1998), English sprinter
Oliver Bronson (1799–1875), American physician
Oliver Brooks (1889–1940), English soldier
Oliver Broome (born 1937), Barbadian cricketer
Oliver Broumis (born 1964), German actor
Oliver Brown (disambiguation), multiple people
Oliver Browne, English furniture maker
Oliver Brownson (1746–1815), American composer
Oliver Bryant (born 1995), English rugby union footballer
Oliver Bryson (1896–1977), English air force officer
Oliver Buchmueller, English scientist
Oliver Ellsworth Buckley (1887–1959), American electrical engineer
Oliver Prince Buel (1838–1899), American lawyer
Oliver Buff (born 1992), Swiss footballer
Oliver Bulleid (1882–1970), British engineer
Oliver Bullough (born 1977), British writer
Oliver Bulman (1902–1974), British paleontologist
Oliver Bell Bunce (1828–1890), American author
Oliver Bundgaard (born 2001), Danish footballer
Oliver D. Burden (1873–1947), American lawyer
Oliver Burgess (born 1981), English footballer
Oliver Burian (born 2001), Slovakian footballer
Oliver Burke (disambiguation), multiple people
Oliver Burkeman (born 1976), British journalist
Oliver Burton (1879–1929), English footballer
Oliver Robert Hawke Bury (1861–1946), English engineer
Oliver Butterworth (disambiguation), multiple people
Oliver Byerly (1840–1929), American politician
Oliver Byrne (disambiguation), multiple people
Oliver Doud Byron (1842–1920), American actor

C
Oliver Callan (born 1980), Irish vocalist
Oliver Camenzind (born 1972), Swiss footballer
Oliver Campbell (1871–1953), American tennis player
Oliver Carlson (1899–1991), American activist
Oliver Carmichael (1891–1966), American academic administrator
Oliver Carminow (??–1597), English politician
Oliver Carter (disambiguation), multiple people
Oliver Caruso (born 1974), German weightlifter
Oliver Cary (1752–1846), Irish priest
Oliver Casey (born 2000), English footballer
Oliver A. Caswell (1826–1885), American politician
Oliver Celestin (born 1981), American football player
Oliver Chace (1769–1852), American businessman
Oliver Newberry Chaffee (1881–1944), American painter
Oliver P. Chandler (1807–1895), American politician
Oliver Chapoy, American musician
Oliver Cheatham (1948–2013), American singer
Oliver Cheshire (born 1988), English fashion model
Oliver Chesler (born 1970), American music artist
Oliver Chesterton (1913–2007), British businessman
Oliver Chirhart (1875–1962), American businessman and politician
Oliver Chris (born 1978), English actor
Oliver Christensen (born 1999), Danish footballer
Oliver Christianson, American cartoonist
Oliver Churchill (1914–1997), British military officer
Oliver Claffey (born 1990), British professional wrestler known as "Gentleman" Jack Gallagher
Oliver Clark (born 1939), American actor
Oliver Clark (rugby league) (born 1996), Australian rugby league footballer
Oliver L. Clark (1836–1908), American politician
Oliver B. Clason (1850–??), American politician
Oliver Clayson (born 1980), English cricketer
Oliver Clifton (1847–1905), American politician
Oliver Edmund Clubb (1901–1989), American diplomat
Oliver Clue (born 1952), Jamaican politician
Oliver Coleman (born 1983), British actor
Oliver J. Coleman (1844–1926), American politician
Oliver Colina (born 1982), Filipino footballer
Oliver Colvile (born 1959), British politician
Oliver Colwell (1834–1872), American soldier
Oliver C. Comstock (1780–1860), American politician 
Oliver Cook (born 1990), British rower
Oliver Cookson, British entrepreneur
Oliver Cooper (disambiguation), multiple people
Oliver Cope (1902–1994), American surgeon
Oliver Copestake (1921–1953), English footballer
Oliver Coppard (born 1981), British politician
Oliver P. Coshow (1863–1937), American politician
Oliver Cotton (born 1944), English actor
Oliver Cowdery (1806–1850), American religious leader
Oliver Cox (1901–1974), Trinidadian-American sociologist
Oliver Crane (born 1998), American rower
Oliver Crane (clergy) (1822–1896), American clergyman
Oliver Crawford (1917–2008), American screenwriter
Oliver Crewe (1947–2020), Irish Gaelic footballer
Oliver D. Crisp (born 1972), English theologian
Oliver Cromwell (disambiguation), multiple people
Oliver S. Crosby (1920–2014), American diplomat
Oliver Crosthwaite-Eyre (1913–1978), British politician
Oliver H. Cross (1868–1960), American politician
Oliver Cuadrado (born 1977), Spanish footballer
Oliver Currill (born 1997), English cricketer
Oliver Cutts (1873–1939), American football player

D
Oliver Daedlow (born 2000), German footballer
Oliver Daemen (born 2002), Dutch space tourist
Oliver Dahler (born 1969), German water polo player
Oliver Dahl-Goli (1897–1976), Norwegian politician
Oliver Ellsworth Daggett (1810–1880), American minister
Oliver Dalrymple (1830–1908), American farmer
Oliver Daniel (1911–1990), American composer
Oliver Darley, American singer
Oliver Davidson (born 2004), Scottish cricketer
Oliver Davies (disambiguation), multiple people
Oliver Davis (disambiguation), multiple people
Oliver Dawnay (1920–1988), British civil servant
Oliver Dean (1783–1871), American physician
Oliver De Coque (1947–2008), Nigerian guitarist
Oliver de Critz (1626–1651), English painter
Oliver De Lancey (disambiguation), multiple people
Oliver de la Paz, Filipino-American poet
Oliver DeMille (born 1968), American author
Oliver Denham (born 2002), Welsh footballer
Oliver de Vaux (??–1244), English nobleman
Oliver E. Diaz Jr., American judge 
Oliver Morton Dickerson (1875–1966), American historian
Oliver James Dickey (1823–1876), American politician
Oliver Dickinson (born 1980), French-English filmmaker
Oliver Booth Dickinson (1857–1939), American judge
Oliver W. Dillard (1926–2015), American general
Oliver Dillon (born 1998), English actor
Oliver Dimitrioski (born 1972), Macedonian handball coach
Oliver Dimsdale (born 1972), English actor
Oliver Dingley (born 1992), Irish diver
Oliver Ditson (1811–1888), American businessman
Oliver Dlouhý (born 1988), Czech entrepreneur
Oliver H. Dockery (1830–1906), American politician
Oliver Đokić (born 1981), Serbian footballer
Oliver Dolan (1894–1985), English rugby league footballer
Oliver D. Doleski (born 1967), German economist
Oliver Domke (born 1976), German field hockey player
Oliver Double (born 1965), British comedian
Oliver Dovin (born 2002), Swedish footballer
Oliver Dowden (born 1978), British politician
Oliver Drachta (born 1977), Austrian football referee
Oliver Dragojević (1947–2018), Croatian singer
Oliver Drake (disambiguation), multiple people
Oliver Drechsel (born 1973), German pianist
Oliver Driver (born 1974), New Zealand actor
Oliver Drost (born 1995), Danish footballer
Oliver Duff (disambiguation), multiple people
Oliver Dulić (born 1975), Serbian politician
Oliver Dunne (born 1977), Irish chef
Oliver Dupont (born 1990), Danish curler
Oliver Dustin (born 2000), British runner
Oliver Dvojakovski (born 1997), Macedonian basketball player
Oliver Dyer (1824–1907), American journalist
Oliver Dynham (??–1500), English priest

E
Oliver P. Echols (1892–1954), American military officer
Oliver Tarbell Eddy (1799–1868), American painter
Oliver Eden (born 1953), British politician
Oliver Valaker Edvardsen (born 1999), Norwegian footballer
Oliver Edwards (1835–1904), American army officer
Oliver Edwards (United States Army officer) (1871–1921), American army officer
Oliver Effersøe (1863–1933), Faroese politician
Oliver Eggimann (1919–2002), Swiss footballer
Oliver Ekman-Larsson (born 1991), Swedish ice hockey player
Oliver Ekroth (born 1992), Swedish footballer
Oliver Elliot (born 1987), Chilean swimmer
Oliver Ellsworth (1745–1807), American lawyer and politician
Oliver Elmes (1934–2011), British graphic designer
Oliver Elton (1861–1945), English literary scholar
Oliver Emanuel (born 1980), British playwright
Oliver Emert (1902–1975), American set decorator
Oliver Farrar Emerson (1860–1927), American educator
Oliver Enkamp (born 1991), Swedish mixed martial artist
Oliver Enwonwu, Nigerian artist
Oliver Eronen (1865–1939), Finnish politician
Oliver Evans (1755–1819), American inventor
Oliver Everett, British diplomat

F
Oliver Farnworth (born 1982), English actor
Oliver Farr (born 1988), Welsh golfer
Oliver Farrer (1904–1954), English politician
Oliver C. Farrington (1864–1933), American geologist
Oliver Fartach-Naini (born 1964), German guitarist
Oliver Atkins Farwell (1867–1944), American botanist
Oliver Lanard Fassig (1860–1936), American meteorologist
Oliver Feldballe (born 1990), Dutch footballer
Oliver Feltham, Australian philosopher
Oliver Ferenc (born 1969), Serbian darts player
Oliver Fernández (disambiguation), multiple people
Oliver Fiechter (born 1972), Swiss philosopher
Oliver Fiennes (1926–2011), English priest
Oliver Filip (born 1998), Austrian footballer
Oliver Filley (1806–1881), American businessman
Oliver Fink (born 1982), German footballer
Oliver Finney (born 1997), English footballer
Oliver Fisher (born 1988), English golfer
Oliver FitzEustace (??–1491), Irish judge
Oliver FitzWilliam (??–1667), Irish nobleman
Oliver Fix (born 1973), German canoeist
Oliver J. Flanagan (1920–1987), Irish politician
Oliver Fletcher (1923–1994), American football player
Oliver Florent (born 1998), Australian rules footballer
Oliver Fobassam (born 2003), German footballer
Oliver W. Fontaine (1900–??), American architect
Oliver Foot (1946–2008), British actor
Oliver Ford (born 1947), American sprinter
Oliver Frederick Ford (1925–1992), English interior designer
Oliver Forster (1925–1999), British diplomat
Oliver Fortuin, South African businessman
Oliver Fox (disambiguation), multiple people
Oliver Frank (1963–2022), German singer
Oliver Franks (1905–1992), English civil servant
Oliver Frazer (1808–1864), American painter
Oliver Freelove (born 1977), British tennis player
Oliver Óge French (??–1666), Irish merchant
Oliver Frey (1948–2022), Swiss-British artist
Oliver W. Frey (1887–1939), American politician
Oliver Fricker (born 1978/1979), Swiss criminal
Oliver Friedmann, German computer scientist
Oliver Friggieri (1947–2020), Maltese poet
Oliver Parker Fritchle (1874–1951), American chemist
Oliver H. Fritz (1905–1985), American politician
Oliver Froning (born 1963), German musician
Oliver Fuchs (born 1971), Austrian tennis player
Oliver Clyde Fuller (1860–1942), American banker
Oliver Furley (1927–2015), English historian

G
Oliver Gagliani (1917–2002), American photographer
Oliver M. Gale (1910–2006), American pioneer
Oliver Gannon (born 1943), Irish-Canadian guitarist
Oliver Max Gardner (1882–1947), American politician
Oliver Garrett (1895–1979), American police officer
Oliver H. P. Garrett (1894–1952), American film director
Oliver Gasch (1906–1999), American judge
Olivér Gáspár (born 1973), Hungarian sports shooter
Oliver Gatty (1907–1940), British chemist
Oliver Gavin (born 1972), British racing driver
Oliver Geis (born 1991), German sports shooter
Oliver Geissen (born 1969), German television presenter
Oliver Geissmann (born 1978), Liechtensteiner sports shooter
Oliver Genausch (born 1991), German footballer
Oliver Gerbig (born 1998), Hong Kong footballer
Oliver Wolcott Gibbs (1822–1908), American chemist
Oliver Gibson (1934–2018), Northern Irish politician
Oliver Gibson (American football) (born 1972), American football player
Oliver Gilbert (born 1972), American politician
Oliver Gilbert (lichenologist) (1936–2005), English lichenologist
Oliver Gildart (born 1996), English rugby league footballer
Oliver Gill (born 1990), English footballer
Oliver Gillie (1937–2021), British journalist
Oliver Gilmour (born 1953), British conductor
Oliver Holmes Gish (1883–1987), American geophysicist
Oliver Glasgow (born 1972), English barrister
Oliver Glasner (born 1974), Austrian football coach
Oliver Gledhill (born 1966), English cellist
Oliver Edmunds Glenn (1878–??), American mathematician
Oliver S. Glisson (1809–1890), American naval officer
Oliver Goethe (born 2004), Danish-German racing driver
Oliver St. John Gogarty (1878–1957), Irish poet
Oliver Golding (born 1993), British tennis player and actor
Oliver Goldsmith (1730–1774), Irish novelist
Oliver Goldstick (born 1961), American screenwriter
Oliver Goodall (1922–2010), American military aviator
Oliver Goodwill (born 1982), British actor
Oliver Ernest Goonetilleke (1892–1978), Sri Lankan politician
Oliver Gordon (disambiguation), multiple people
Oliver Goss (born 1994), Australian golfer
Oliver Gottwald (born 1978), German singer
Oliver Gough (1935–2020), Irish hurler
Oliver Robert Gould (1874–1951), Canadian farmer
Oliver Grace, Irish politician 
Oliver Dowell John Grace (1791–1871), Irish politician
Oliver Graham (born 1995), English cricketer
Oliver Grainger (born 1988), Canadian actor
Oliver Granger (1794–1841), American religious figure
Oliver Grant (disambiguation), multiple people
Oliver Grau (born 1965), German art historian
Oliver Green (born 1951), English author
Oliver B. Greene (1915–1976), American religious figure
Oliver Duff Greene (1833–1904), American army officer
Oliver Green-Wilkinson (1913–1970), English bishop
Oliver Gregory (1917–2001), Australian politician
Oliver Griffin (born 1983), British visual artist
Oliver Grimm (born 1969), Swiss gymnast
Oliver Gross (born 1973), German tennis player
Oliver Dennett Grover (1861–1927), American painter
Oliver Grün (born 1969), German engineer
Oliver Grundmann (born 1971), German politician
Oliver Grüner (born 1966), German rower
Oliver Gunning (born 1996), Irish cricketer
Oliver Günther (born 1961), German academic administrator
Oliver Gurney (1911–2001), English historian
Oliver Gussenberg (born 1976), German judoka
Oliver Gustafsson (born 1993), Swedish footballer
Oliver Gutfleisch, German volleyball player
Oliver Guy-Watkins (born 1979), British film director
Oliver Gwilt (born 1993), Welsh badminton player

H
Oliver Haarmann (born 1967), German financier
Oliver Haden, British actor
Oliver Hailey (1932–1993), American screenwriter
Olivér Halassy (1909–1946), Hungarian water polo player
Oliver Hald (born 1999), Danish cricketer
Oliver Hall (1852–1946), American politician
Oliver Hall (YPG fighter) (1993–2017), British volunteer soldier
Oliver Spencer Halstead (1792–1877), American politician
Oliver Deveta Hamlin Jr. (1892–1973), American judge
Oliver Hammond (born 2002), Welsh footballer
Oliver Hampel (born 1985), German footballer
Oliver Hannon-Dalby (born 1989), English cricketer
Oliver Hanrahan (born 1998), Australian rules footballer
Oliver Hardy (1892–1957), American comic actor
Oliver Harms (1901–1980), American religious figure
Oliver Harriman (1829–1904), American businessman
Oliver Harriman Jr. (1862–1940), American stockbroker
Oliver Harris, British academic
Oliver Harris (trade unionist) (1873–1944), Welsh trade unionist
Oliver Harrison, English filmmaker
Oliver Hart (disambiguation), multiple people
Oliver C. Hartley (1823–1859), American lawyer
Oliver Hartmann (born 1970), German musician
Oliver Marc Hartwich (born 1975), German economist
Oliver Harvey (disambiguation), multiple people
Oliver Hassencamp (1921–1988), German writer
Oliver Hawkins (born 1992), English footballer
Oliver Perry Hay (1846–1930), American paleontologist
Oliver Hayes-Brown (born 2000), Australian basketball player
Oliver Haywood (1911–2002), American army officer
Oliver Haze, Canadian singer-songwriter
Oliver Heald (born 1954), British politician
Oliver Heaviside (1850–1925), English electrical engineer
Oliver Hegi (born 1993), Swiss gymnast
Oliver Heil (born 1988), German footballer
Oliver Helander (born 1997), Finnish javelin thrower
Oliver Held (born 1972), German footballer
Oliver Heldens (born 1995), Dutch disc jockey
Oliver T Hellriegel (born 1965), German-American author
Oliver Hemsley (born 1962), English businessman
Olivier Hendriks (born 2003), Dutch Paralympic athlete
Oliver Henry (disambiguation), multiple people
Oliver Herber (born 1981), German footballer
Oliver Herbrich (born 1961), German filmmaker
Oliver Herford (1860–1935), English-American writer
Oliver Hermanus (born 1983), South African film director
Oliver Herring (born 1964), German artist
Oliver Heyward (1926–2003), Australian bishop
Oliver Heywood (1825–1892), English banker and philanthropist
Oliver Heywood (minister) (1630–1702), British minister
Oliver Hill (disambiguation), multiple people
Oliver Hilmes (born 1971), German author
Oliver Hirschbiegel (born 1957), German film director
Oliver Hoare (1945–2018), English art dealer
Oliver Hogue (1880–1919), Australian soldier
Oliver Holden (1765–1844), American composer
Oliver Holmes (rugby league) (born 1992), English rugby league footballer
Oliver Wendell Holmes Jr. (1841–1935), American jurist
Oliver Wendell Holmes Sr. (1809–1894), American physician and poet
Oliver Holt (born 1966), English sports journalist
Oliver J. Holtan (1891–1971), American businessman and politician
Oliver Holzbecher (born 1970), German footballer
Oliver Höner (born 1966), Swiss figure skater
Oliver Horn (1901–1960), American water polo player
Oliver Horsbrugh (1937–2009), British television director
Olivér Horváth (born 2000), Hungarian footballer
Oliver Otis Howard (1830–1909), American army officer
Oliver Aiken Howland (1847–1905), Canadian politician
Oliver Hoyt (1823–1887), American politician
Oliver Hoyte (born 1984), American football player
Oliver Hudson (born 1976), American actor
Oliver Madox Hueffer (1877–1931), English author
Oliver Hughes (disambiguation), multiple people
Oliver Huie (1878–1951), American football player
Oliver Humperdink (1949–2011), American professional wrestler
Oliver Hundebøll (born 1999), Danish golfer
Oliver M. Hungerford (1827–1888), American politician
Oliver Huntemann (born 1968), German disc jockey
Oliver Hunter (born 1934), Guyanese sprinter
Oliver Hüsing (born 1993), German footballer
Oliver Hutton (born 1979), South African cricketer
Oliver Huyshe (1885–1960), English cricketer
Oliver Moulton Hyde (1804–1870), American businessman
Oliver Hynd (born 1994), British swimmer

I
Oliver Ibielski (1971–2017), German rower
Oliver Igel (born 1978), German politician
Oliver Ingham (1287–1344), English knight
Oliver Ingrosso (born 1989), Swedish disc jockey
Oliver Irving, British film director
Oliver Ivanović (1953–2018), Serbian politician

J
Oliver Jackson (disambiguation), multiple people
Oliver Jackson-Cohen (born 1986), English actor and model
Oliver James (disambiguation), multiple people
Oliver Jandrić (born 1972), Bosnian footballer
Oliver Janich (born 1969), German conspiracy theorist
Oliver Janso (born 1993), Slovakian footballer
Oliver Erichson Janson (1850–1925), English entomologist
Oliver Jarvis (born 1984), English racing driver
Oliver Jeffers (born 1977), Northern Irish artist
Oliver Peebles Jenkins (1850–1935), American psychologist
Oliver Jennings (disambiguation), multiple people
Oliver Jessel (1929–2017), New Zealand-British businessman
Oliver John (born 1959), American psychologist
Oliver Johnston (actor) (1888–1966), English actor
Oliver Jokeľ (born 1991), Slovakian ice hockey player
Oliver Jones (disambiguation), multiple people
Oliver Jovanovic (born 1966), American microbiologist

K
Oliver Kaczmarek (born 1970), German politician
Oliver Kahn (born 1969), German footballer
Oliver Kalkofe (born 1965), German columnist
Oliver Källbom (born 1995), Swedish ice hockey player
Oliver Kamm (born 1963), British writer and journalist
Oliver Kapanen (born 2003), Finnish ice hockey player
Oliver Kass Kawo (born 2001), Syrian footballer
Oliver Kaul, German professor
Oliver Kayser (born 1973), Austrian fencer
Oliver Kegel (born 1961), German canoeist
Oliver Kelley (disambiguation), multiple people
Oliver Dimon Kellogg (1878–1932), American mathematician
Oliver Kelly (1777–1834), Irish clergyman
Oliver Kentish (bron 1954), British cellist
Oliver Kessing (1890–1963), American naval officer
Oliver Kieffer (born 1979), French volleyball player
Oliver Kilbourn (1904–1993), British painter
Oliver Killeen (born 1937), Irish fraudster
Oliver Kimberley, English priest
Oliver King (disambiguation), multiple people
Oliver Kirch (born 1982), German footballer
Oliver Kirk (1884–1960), American boxer
Oliver Kite (1920–1968), English naturalist
Oliver Kitson (1915–1996), British politician
Oliver Kizito (born 1988), Kenyan rugby union footballer
Oliver Klaus (born 1990), Swiss footballer
Oliver Klitten (born 2000), Danish footballer
Oliver Knight (born 1969), British singer-songwriter
Oliver Knussen (1952–2018), English composer
Oliver Koenig (born 1981), German sprinter
Oliver Kohlenberg (born 1957), German composer
Oliver Köhrmann (born 1976), German handball player
Oliver Koletzki (born 1974), German disc jockey
Oliver Konsa (born 1985), Estonian footballer
Oliver Koppell (born 1940), American politician and lawyer
Oliver Korittke (born 1968), German actor
Oliver Korn (born 1984), German field hockey player
Oliver Korte (born 1969), German composer
Oliver Kostić (born 1973), Serbian basketball coach
Oliver Kosturanov (1968–2014), Macedonian businessman
Oliver Kovačević (born 1974), Serbian footballer
Olivér Kovács (born 1990), Hungarian footballer
Oliver Katwesigye Koyekyenga (born 1974), Ugandan businesswoman
Oliver Knussen (1952–2018), British composer and conductor
Oliver Kraas (born 1975), South African skier
Oliver Kragl (born 1990), German footballer
Oliver Kraus (born 1970), English musician
Oliver Kreuzer (born 1965), German footballer
Oliver Kreyssig (born 1966), German musician
Oliver Krischer (born 1969), German politician
Oliver Krüger (born 1973), German professor
Oliver Kruuda (born 1967), Estonian entrepreneur
Oliver Kuhn (1898–1968), American athlete and businessman
Oliver Kurtz (born 1971), German field hockey player
Oliver Kuusik (born 1980), Estonian musician
Oliver Kylington (born 1997), Swedish ice hockey player

L
Oliver La Farge (1901–1963), American anthropologist
Oliver Lafayette (born 1984), American basketball player
Oliver LaGrone (1906–1995), American sculptor
Oliver Lake (born 1942), American musician
Oliver Lambart (??–1618), Irish military commander
Oliver Lamoreux (1924–1891), American politician
Oliver Lampe (born 1974), German swimmer
Oliver Lam-Watson (born 1992), British fencer
Oliver Lang, American paintball player
Oliver Langdon, Canadian politician
Oliver Lange (1927–2013), American author
Oliver H. Langeland (1887–1958), Norwegian military officer
Oliver Langford, English football referee
Oliver Lansley (born 1981), British actor
Oliver Waterman Larkin (1896–1970), American art historian
Oliver Larraz (born 2001), American soccer player
Oliver Larsen (born 1998), Danish ice hockey player
Oliver Lauridsen (born 1989), Danish ice hockey player
Oliver Laux (born 1990), German footballer
Oliver Lavigilante, Mauritanian boxer
Oliver Law (1900–1937), American labor organizer
Oliver Lawrence (1507–1559), English politician
Oliver Laxe (born 1982), French-Spanish film director
Oliver Laxton (born 1999), Hong Kong footballer
Oliver Ingraham Lay (1845–1890), American painter
Oliver Layne (1876–1932), West Indian cricketer
Oliver Leaman (born 1950), American professor
Oliver LeBoutillier (1894–1983), American aviator
Oliver Lederer (born 1978), Austrian football manager
Oliver Lee (disambiguation), multiple people
Oliver Leese (1894–1978), British army officer
Oliver Elles Leggett (1876–1946), English naval officer
Oliver Legipont (1698–1758), German bibliographer
Oliver Leith (born 1990), British composer
Oliver Le Neve (1662–1711), English land owner
Oliver Lepsius (born 1964), German professor
Oliver Letwin (born 1956), British politician
Oliver Levick (1899–1965), English footballer
Oliver Lewis (1856–1924), American jockey
Oliver Lewis (violinist) (born 1971), British violinist
Oliver Leydon-Davis (born 1990), New Zealand badminton player
Oliver Leyland (born 2001), English rugby league footballer
Oliver Lieb (born 1969), German disc jockey
Oliver Lines (born 1995), English snooker player
Oliver Linton, English professor
Oliver Lis (born 1984), Colombian editor
Oliver Lloyd (1570/1571–1625), Welsh priest
Oliver Lloyd (MP) (1527–1589), Welsh politician
Oliver Locker-Lampson (1880–1954), British politician
Oliver Lodge (1851–1940), British physicist and writer 
Oliver W. F. Lodge (1878–1955), English poet and author
Oliver Loftéen (1979–2021), Swedish actor
Oliver Loode (born 1974), Estonian activist
Oliver Leland Loring (1904–1979), American bishop
Oliver Loving (1812–1867), American rancher
Oliver H. Lowry (1910–1996), American biochemist
Oliver Lozano (1940–2018), Filipino lawyer
Oliver Luck (born 1960), American football player
Oliver Luckett (born 1974), American entrepreneur
Oliver Luke (1574–1651), English politician
Oliver Luksic (born 1979), German politician
Oliver Lund (born 1990), Danish footballer
Oliver Lincoln Lundquist (1916–2008), American architect
Oliver Luterán (born 2001), Slovakian footballer
Oliver Lyle (1891–1961), British inventor
Oliver Lyne (1944–2005), British academic
Oliver Lynn (1926–1996), American talent manager
Oliver Lyttelton (1893–1972), British businessman and politician

M
Oliver Ogedengbe Macaulay (1918–1972), Nigerian politician
Oliver MacDonagh (1924–2002), Irish professor
Oliver Macdonald (1904–1973), American athlete
Oliver MacGreevy (1928–1981), Irish actor
Oliver Mack (born 1957), American basketball player
Oliver Maillard (1430–1502), British preacher
Oliver Makor (born 1973), Liberian footballer
Oliver Maltman (born 1976), English actor
Oliver Mandić (born 1953), Serbian musician
Oliver Mann, Australian singer-songwriter
Oliver D. Mann (1877–1956), American football player
Oliver Manners (1581–1613), English politician
Oliver Marach (born 1980), Austrian tennis player
Oliver Marcell (1895–1949), American baseball player
Oliver Marcy (1820–1899), American academic administrator
Oliver Maric (born 1981), Croatian-Swiss footballer
Oliver Mark (born 1963), German photographer
Oliver Markoutz (born 1995), Austrian footballer
Oliver Marks (1866–1940), English cricketer
Oliver Marmol (born 1986), American baseball manager
Oliver Maron (born 1983), Slovakian ice hockey player
Oliver T. Marsh (1892–1941), American cinematographer
Oliver S. Marshall (1850–1934), American politician
Oliver Marti (born 1970), Canadian-American investor
Oliver Martin (disambiguation), multiple people
Oliver Martini (born 1971), Italian racing driver
Oliver Martinov (born 1975), Croatian rower
Oliver Mathews (1520–1618), Welsh chronicler
Oliver Matuschek, German author
Oliver Mason (born 1979), British actor
Oliver Masucci (born 1968), German actor
Oliver Mayer, American playwright
Oliver Mbekeka (born 1979), Ugandan football manager
Oliver McCall (born 1965), American boxer
Oliver McGee (1957–2020), American political analyst
Oliver McGrath (born 1938), Irish sportsman
Oliver McGregor (1921–1997), British sociologist
Oliver McMullan (born 1952), Irish politician
Oliver McQuaid (born 1954), Irish cyclist
Oliver Mears, English opera director
Oliver Batista Meier (born 2001), German footballer
Oliver Mellor (born 1981), British actor
Oliver Messel (1904–1978), English artist
Oliver Milburn (born 1973), English actor
Oliver Miles (1936–2019), British diplomat
Oliver Miller (born 1970), American basketball player
Oliver Minatel (born 1992), Brazilian footballer
Olivér Mink (born 1970), Hungarian football coach
Oliver Mintzlaff (born 1975), German football referee
Oliver Mlakar (born 1935), Croatian television presenter
Oliver Mobisson (1943–2010), Nigerian entrepreneur
Oliver Mohr (born 1992), Austrian footballer
Oliver Monksfield, English footballer
Oliver Montagu (1655–1689), English politician
Oliver J. Moore, British historian
Oliver Moors (born 1996), British cyclist
Oliver Morgan (1933–2007), American singer
Oliver Morosco (1875–1945), American theatrical producer
Oliver Morris (1916–1944), Welsh rugby league footballer
Oliver Morris (gymnast) (1886–??), British gymnast
Oliver A. Morse (1815–1870), American politician
Oliver Morton (science writer), British science writer
Oliver P. Morton (1823–1877), American politician
Oliver Mowat (1820–1903), Canadian politician
Oliver Moxon (1922–1989), British politician
Oliver Møystad (1892–1956), Norwegian engineer
Oliver Mtukudzi (1952–2019), Zimbabwean musician
Oliver Mueller, German volleyball player
Oliver Muirhead (born 1957), English actor
Oliver Mundell (born 1989), Scottish politician
Oliver B. Munroe (1856–1916), American politician
Oliver Muoto (born 1969), Polish-Nigerian entrepreneur

N
Oliver Naesen (born 1990), Belgian cyclist
Olivér Nagy (born 1989), Hungarian footballer
Oliver Napier (1935–2011), Northern Irish politician
Oliver F. Naquin (1904–1989), American naval officer
Oliver Nash (1931–2013), American politician
Oliver Neighbour (1923–2015), British librarian
Oliver Nelson (1932–1975), American musician
Oliver Neuville (born 1973), German footballer
Oliver Newby (born 1984), English cricketer
Oliver Newey (born 1986), Guernsey cricketer
Oliver Newman (disambiguation), multiple people
Oliver Newmarch (1834–1920), British army officer
Oliver N'Goma (1959–2010), Gabonese musician
Oliver Nicolls (1740–1829), British army officer
Oliver Nightingale (born 1995), Guernsey cricketer
Oliver John Nilsen (1884–1977), Australian businessman and politician
Oliver Njego (born 1959), Serbian musician
Oliver Noonan (1939–1969), American photographer
Oliver Norburn (born 1992), English footballer
Oliver Norman (1911–1983), English cricketer
Oliver North (born 1943), American colonel and political commentator
Oliver Danson North (1887–1968), British engineer
Oliver Norwood (born 1991), English footballer
Oliver Nugent (1860–1926), British army officer

O
Oliver Oakes (born 1988), British racing driver
Oliver O'Brien (1839–1894), American naval officer
Oliver Ocasek (1925–1999), American politician
Oliver O'Donovan (born 1945), British priest
Oliver Oetke (born 1968), German beach volleyball player
Oliver O'Gara, Irish politician
Oliver O'Grady (born 1945), Irish priest
Oliver O'Halloran (born 2000), Australian aviator
Oliver Olsen (born 2000), Danish footballer
Oliver Olsen (gymnast), American gymnast
Oliver Ongtawco (1941–2020), Filipino bowler
Oliver Onions (1873–1961), English writer
Oliver Orav (born 1995), Estonian volleyball player
Oliver Ormsby (1767–1832), American businessman
Oliver Orok (born 1963), Nigerian weightlifter
Oliver Ortega (born 1996), Dominican baseball player
Oliver Ortíz (born 1993), Mexican footballer
Oliver Ortmann (born 1967), German pool player
Oliver Otto (born 1972), German footballer

P
Oliver Paasch (born 1971), Belgian politician
Oliver Padel (born 1948), English historian
Oliver Pagé (born 1971), German footballer
Oliver Palotai (born 1974), German musician
Oliver Park (born 1986), British writer
Oliver Parker (born 1960), English film director
Oliver Parks (1899–1985), American aviator
Oliver Partington (born 1998), English rugby league footballer
Oliver Partridge (1712–1792), English military officer
Oliver Hazard Payne (1839–1917), American businessman
Oliver Payne Pearson (1915–2003), American zoologist
Oliver Peck (born 1971), American tattoo artist
Oliver Pendlebury (born 2002), English footballer
Oliver Penrose (born 1929), British physicist
Óliver Pérez (born 1981), Mexican baseball player
Oliver Perry (disambiguation), multiple people
Oliver Perry-Smith (1884–1969), American mountaineer
Oliver Petersch (born 1989), German footballer
Oliver Petersen (born 2001), Norwegian footballer
Oliver Peterson (born 1976), American artist
Oliver Petrak (born 1991), Croatian footballer
Oliver Petrucciani (born 1969), Swiss motorcycle racer
Oliver Petrushevski, Macedonian police officer
Oliver Petszokat (born 1978), German singer
Oliver Pett (born 1988), English squash player
Oliver Peyton (born 1961), Irish restauranteur
Oliver Phelps (1749–1809), American tavern keeper
Oliver Phelps (actor) (born 1986), English actor
Oliver Phillips (ecologist), British ecologist
Oliver Philpot (1913–1993), Canadian-English air force officer
Oliver S. Picher (1905–1984), American lieutenant general
Oliver Pigg, English clergyman
Oliver Pikati (born 1973), Botswanan footballer
Oliver Pike (disambiguation), multiple people
Oliver Piper (1884–1933), Welsh rugby union footballer
Oliver Pitcher (born 1983), Bermudian cricketer
Olivér Pittner (1911–1971), Hungarian painter
Oliver Platt (born 1960), American actor
Oliver Plunkett (disambiguation), multiple people
Oliver Pocher (born 1978), German comedian
Oliver Podhorín (born 1992), Slovakian footballer
Oliver Pollock (1737–1823), American merchant
Oliver Pongratz (born 1973), German badminton player
Oliver Poole (disambiguation), multiple people
Oliver Popović (born 1970), Serbian basketball coach
Oliver Popplewell (born 1927), British judge
Oliver Postgate (1925–2008), English writer
Oliver Pötschke (born 1987), German footballer
Oliver Pötzsch (born 1970), German author
Oliver Pough, American football coach
Oliver Powell (disambiguation), multiple people
Oliver Pranjic (born 1994), Austrian footballer
Oliver Práznovský (born 1991), Slovakian footballer
Oliver Prescott (1731–1804), English physician
Oliver Sherman Prescott (1924–1903), American priest
Oliver Preston (born 1962), British cartoonist
Oliver H. Prince (1782–1837), American politician
Oliver Proske (born 1971), German stage designer
Oliver Provstgaard (born 2003), Danish footballer
Oliver Puflett (born 1999), Australian footballer
Oliver Purnell (born 1953), American basketball coach
Oliver Pusztai (born 1981), Hungarian footballer

Q
Oliver Chase Quick (1885–1944), English theologian

R
Oliver Rackham (1939–2015), English professor
Oliver Henry Radkey (1909–2000), American historian
Oliver Ranasinghe, Sri Lankan military officer
Oliver Randolph (1877–1951), American lawyer and politician
Oliver Rasmussen (born 2000), Danish racing driver
Oliver Rathbone (born 1996), English footballer
Oliver Rathkolb (born 1955), Austrian historian
Oliver Rátót (??–1244), Hungarian noble
Oliver Rau (born 1968), German rower
Oliver Raymond (1605–1679), English politician
Oliver Ready (born 1976), British translator
Oliver Reck (born 1965), German footballer
Oliver Redgate (1898–1929), British pilot
Oliver Redgate (cricketer) (1863–1913), English cricketer
Oliver Reed (1938–1999), English actor
Oliver Ressler (born 1970), Austrian artist
Oliver Reynolds (born 1957), British poet
Oliver Reynolds (cricketer) (1921–2014), South African cricketer
Oliver G. Richard (born 1952), American businessman
Oliver Riedel (born 1971), German musician
Oliver Rifai (born 1993), Dutch footballer
Oliver Ringelhahn (born 1969), Austrian opera singer
Oliver Risser (born 1980), Namibian footballer
Oliver Roberts (born 1994), Irish rugby league footballer
Oliver Roberts (footballer) (born 1996), English footballer
Oliver Robins (born 1971), American writer and actor
Oliver Robinson (born 1960), American basketball player
Oliver Roggisch (born 1978), German handball player
Oliver Rohrbeck (born 1965), German actor
Oliver P. Rood (1844–1885), American soldier
Oliver Roome (1921–2009), British army officer
Oliver Rosengren (born 1992), Swedish politician
Oliver Ross (disambiguation), multiple people
Oliver Rossiter (born 1991), English footballer
Oliver Roth (disambiguation), multiple people
Oliver Roup, Canadian entrepreneur
Oliver Rousseau (1891–1977), American developer
Oliver Rowland (born 1992), British racing driver
Oliver Russell (born 1998), English rugby league footballer
Oliver Russell, 2nd Baron Ampthill (1869–1935), British politician
Oliver Ryan (born 1985), English footballer

S
Oliver Sacks (1933–2015), British-American neurologist and writer
Oliver Sadler (born 1987), English cricketer
Oliver Saffell (born 1986), English cricketer
Oliver Sail (born 1996), New Zealand footballer
Oliver Sain (1932–2003), American songwriter
Oliver Saksak (born 1960), Vanuatuan judge
Oliver Samuel (1849–1925), New Zealand politician
Oliver Samuels (born 1948), Jamaican comedian
Oliver Sarkic (born 1997), English footballer
Oliver Sartor, American oncologist
Oliver Saunders (born 1986), Australian-Filipino rugby union footballer
Oliver Saunyama (??–1980), Botswanan teacher
Oliver Sayler (1887–1958), American writer
Oliver Scarles (born 2005), English footballer
Oliver Schaller (born 1994), Swiss badminton player
Oliver Schmidt (disambiguation), multiple people
Oliver Schmitt (born 1973), Austrian professor
Oliver Schmitt (footballer) (born 2000), German footballer
Oliver Schmitz (born 1960), South African film director
Oliver Schneller (born 1966), German composer
Oliver Schnitzler (born 1995), German footballer
Oliver Schnyder (born 1973), Swiss pianist
Oliver Scholfield (born 1993), Canadian field hockey player
Oliver Schöpf (born 1990), Austrian footballer
Oliver Schreiner (1890–1980), South African judge
Oliver Schröder (born 1980), German footballer
Oliver Schroer (1956–2008), Canadian musician
Oliver Schröm (born 1964), German investigative journalist
Oliver Schweißing (born 1971), German footballer
Oliver Schwerdt (born 1979), German musicologist
Oliver Scott (1922–2016), English biologist
Oliver Seack (born 1962), German canoeist
Oliver Sean (born 1979), English singer-songwriter
Oliver Seibert (1881–1944), Canadian ice hockey player
Oliver Selfridge (1926–2008), English businessman
Oliver Sensen, German philosopher
Oliver Seraphin (born 1943), Dominican politician
Oliver Seth (1915–1996), American judge
Oliver Setzinger (born 1983), Austrian ice hockey player
Oliver B. Shallenberger (1860–1898), American engineer
Oliver Shanks (1915–1970), Canadian boxer
Oliver Shannon (born 1995), English footballer
Oliver Shanti (born 1948), German musician
Oliver Shaw (1779–1848), American composer
Oliver Sheldon (1894–1951), English business administrator
Oliver Shepard (born 1946), British explorer
Oliver Sheppard (1865–1941), Irish sculptor
Oliver Sherwood (born 1955), British hunter
Oliver Henry Shoup (1869–1940), American politician
Oliver Sigurjónsson (born 1995), Icelandic footballer
Oliver Silverholt (born 1994), Swedish footballer
Oliver Simmonds (1897–1985), British aviator
Oliver Simmons (disambiguation), multiple people
Oliver Simon (born 1945), English priest
Oliver Sims (1943–2015), British computer scientist
Oliver Sin (born 1985), Hungarian painter
Oliver Sinclair (disambiguation), multiple people
Oliver Sipple (1941–1989), American soldier
Oliver Skeete (born 1956), British showjumper
Oliver Skipp (born 2000), English footballer
Oliver Slipper (born 1976), English cricketer
Oliver Solberg (born 2001), Swedish-Norwegian racing driver
Oliver Sollitt (1860–1945), American politician
Oliver Sonne (born 2000), Danish footballer
Oliver Sørensen (born 2002), Danish footballer
Oliver Sorg (born 1990), German footballer
Oliver Smedley (1911–1989), English businessman
Oliver Smith (disambiguation), multiple people
Oliver Smithies (1925–2017), British-American geneticist
Oliver R. Smoot (born 1940), American technology consultant
Oliver G. Snow (1849–1931), American politician
Oliver P. Snyder (1833–1882), American politician
Oliver Spasovski (born 1976), Macedonian politician
Oliver L. Spaulding (1833–1922), American soldier and politician
Oliver Lyman Spaulding (1875–1947), American army general
Oliver Spencer (1736–1811), American military officer
Oliver M. Spencer (1829–1895), American academic administrator
Oliver Spencer-Wortley (born 1984), English composer
Oliver Spiteri (born 1970), Maltese footballer
Oliver M. W. Sprague (1873–1953), American economist
Oliver Stamm (born 1966), Austrian beach volleyball player
Oliver Stang (born 1988), German footballer
Oliver Stanhope (born 1998), British Paralympic rower
Oliver Stanisic (born 1994), Swiss footballer
Oliver Stanley (1896–1950), British politician
Oliver Stapleton (born 1948), English cinematographer
Oliver Stark (born 1991), British actor
Oliver Starkey (1523–1583/1586), English knight
Oliver Starr (1883–1961), American judge
Oliver St Clair (??–1523), Scottish noble
Oliver Steurer (born 1995), German footballer
Oliver Stevens (1825–1905), American attorney and politician
Oliver Stević (born 1984), Serbian basketball player
Oliver Stewart (1896–1976), English pilot ace
Oliver W. Stewart (1867–1937), American politician
Oliver Stierle (born 1983), German footballer
Oliver St John (disambiguation), multiple people
Oliver Stöckli (born 1976), Swiss footballer
Oliver Stokes (born 1998), English actor
Oliver Stokowski (born 1962), German actor
Oliver Stone (born 1946), American film director
Oliver Stonor (1903–1987), English novelist
Oliver E. Story (1885–1961), American composer
Oliver Strachey (1874–1960), British civil servant
Oliver Stritzel (born 1957), German actor
Oliver Strunk (1901–1980), American musicologist
Oliver Strunz (born 2000), Austrian footballer
Oliver Stuenkel (born 1982), German-Brazilian political scientist
Oliver Stummvoll (born 1995), Austrian fashion model
Oliver Stutchbury (1927–2011), British politician
Oliver Sundberg (born 1982), Danish speedskater
Oliver Sutton (disambiguation), multiple people
Oliver Swann (1878–1948), British military officer
Oliver Sykes (born 1986), English singer-songwriter
Olivér Szolnoki (born 1997), Hungarian pool player

T
Olivér Tamás (born 2001), Hungarian footballer
Oliver Tambo (1917–1993), South African politician
Oliver Tank, Australian musician
Oliver Taplin (born 1943), British academic
Oliver Tappin (1893–1945), American politician
Oliver Tarney (born 1970), British sound engineer
Oliver Tärnström (born 2002), Swedish ice hockey player
Oliver Taylor (disambiguation), multiple people
Oliver Perry Temple (1820–1907), American attorney
Oliver Thomas (born 1957), American politician
Oliver Thompson (born 1988), English musician
Oliver Thornton (born 1979), Welsh singer
Oliver Thychosen (born 1993), Danish footballer
Oliver Tichy (born 1975), Austrian racing driver
Oliver Tickell, British journalist
Oliver Tobias (born 1947), English actor
Oliver Todd (1916–2001), American musician
Oliver Toledo (born 1987), Chilean footballer
Oliver Tomaszczyk (born 1986), English rugby union footballer
Oliver Tomkins (1908–1992), English bishop
Oliver Fellows Tomkins (1873–1901), English missionary
Oliver Tomlinson (born 2002), English footballer
Oliver Tompsett (born 1981), British actor
Oliver Samuel Tonks (1874–1953), American historian
Óliver Torres (born 1994), Spanish footballer
Oliver Townend (born 1982), British jockey
Oliver G. Traphagen (1854–1932), American architect
Oliver Tree (born 1993), American singer-songwriter
Oliver Tress (born 1967), British businessman
Oliver Treyz (1918–1998), American television executive
Oliver Trinder (1907–1981), British fencer
Oliver Tummon (1884–1955), English footballer
Oliver Turnbull (1919–2009), Scottish rugby union footballer
Oliver Turvey (born 1987), British racing driver

U
Oliver A. Unger (1914–1981), American film producer
Oliver Unsöld (born 1973), German footballer
Oliver Uppill (1876–1946), Australian politician
Oliver Urso (born 1999), Danish footballer

V
Oliver Vachell (1518–1564), English politician
Oliver deGray Vanderbilt (1884–1960), American basketball player
Oliver Vardy (1906–1980), Canadian broadcaster
Oliver Vaquer, American actor
Olivér Várhelyi (born 1972), Hungarian lawyer
Oliver Venno (born 1990), Estonian volleyball player
Oliver Villadsen (born 2001), Danish footballer
Oliver Vitouch (born 1971), Austrian psychologist
Oliver Vogt (born 1977), German politician
Oliver von Dohnányi (born 1955), Slovakian conductor
Oliver Vujović (born 1969), German-Austrian journalist

W
Oliver Wähling (born 1999), German footballer
Oliver Wahlstrom (born 2000), Swedish-American ice hockey player
Oliver Wainwright (born 1984), British architecture critic
Oliver Wakefield (1909–1956), British actor
Oliver Wakeman (born 1972), English musician
Oliver Walker (disambiguation), multiple people
Oliver Wallace (1887–1963), British composer and conductor
Oliver Wallop (1861–1943), British politician
Oliver Walther (born 1972), German gymnast
Oliver Winston Wanger (born 1940), American judge
Oliver Wardrop (1864–1948), British diplomat
Oliver Warner (1903–1976), British historian
Oliver Warner (politician) (1818–1885), American politician
Oliver Watts, Australian artist
Oliver Patterson Watts (18651953), American chemical engineer
Oliver Webb (born 1991), British auto racing driver
Oliver Weber (born 1970), German photographer
Oliver Weeks, English composer
Oliver Weerasinghe (1907–1980), Sri Lankan architect
Oliver Weindling (born 1955), British jazz promoter
Oliver Weiss, German-American soccer coach
Oliver Welden (1946–2021), Chilean poet
Oliver Welke (born 1966), German television presenter
Oliver Elwin Wells (1853–1922), American educator
Oliver Westerbeek (born 1966), German footballer
Oliver Wheeler (1890–1962), Canadian surveyor
Oliver Whiddon, English archdeacon
Oliver Whitby (1602–1679), English priest
Oliver White (disambiguation), multiple people
Oliver Whitehead (born 1948), English musician
Oliver John Whitley (1912–2005), English broadcasting administrator
Oliver Whyte (born 2000), New Zealand politician
Oliver Widmann (born 2001), German cyclist
Oliver Widmer (born 1965), Swiss musician
Oliver James Wilcox (1869–1917), Canadian politician
Oliver Wilde (born 1988), English musician
Oliver C. Wiley (1851–1917), American politician
Oliver Wilkes (born 1980), Scottish rugby league footballer
Oliver Williams (disambiguation), multiple people
Oliver E. Williamson (1932–2020), American economist
Oliver Wilson (born 1980), English golfer
Oliver Wilson (rugby league) (born 2000), English rugby league footballer
Oliver Winchester (1810–1880), American businessman
Oliver Windholz, German corporate executive
Oliver Winterbottom (1944–2020), British automotive designer
Oliver Wittke (born 1966), German politician
Oliver Wolcott (1726–1797), American politician
Oliver Wolcott Jr. (1760–1833), American politician and judge
Oliver Wonekha (born 1951), Ugandan politician
Oliver Wood (disambiguation), multiple people
Oliver Woodward (1885–1966), Australian metallurgist
Oliver Wright (disambiguation), multiple people
Oliver Wrong (1925–2012), English academic
Oliver Reynolds Wulf (1897–1987), American chemist
Oliver Wyman (actor), American voice actor
Oliver Wynne-Griffith (born 1994), British rower
Oliver Wyss (born 1974), Swiss football manager

Y
Oliver Yantis (1869–1892), American outlaw
Oliver Youll (born 1970), English cricketer
Oliver Young (1855–1908), English naval officer

Z
Oliver Zahn, German-American astrophysicist
Oliver Zandén (born 2001), Swedish footballer
Oliver Zangwill (1913–1987), British neuropsychologist
Oliver Zapel (born 1968), German footballer
Oliver Zaugg (born 1981), Swiss cyclist
Oliver Zeidler (born 1996), German rower
Oliver Zelenika (born 1993), Croatian footballer
Oliver Zhang (born 1997), Canadian-Japanese ice dancer
Oliver Zipse (born 1964), German corporate executive
Oliver Zompro, German biologist
Oliver Zono (born 1991), South African rugby union footballer

Fictional characters
Oliver Barnes, a character on the soap opera Neighbours
Oliver B. Bumble, a character in comic series' by Marten Toonder
Oliver Wendell Douglas, a character on the television series Green Acres
Oliver Fish, a character on the drama series One Life to Live
Oliver Queen, a DC Comics character
Oliver Sabel, a character on the soap opera Verbotene Liebe
Oliver Trask, a character on the television series The O.C.
Oliver Twist (character), the main character of Charles Dickens' novel Oliver Twist
Oliver Valentine, a character on the drama series Holby City

See also
Oliver (surname), a page for people with the surname "Oliver"
Oliver (disambiguation), a disambiguation page for "Oliver"
Olivier (surname), a page for people with the surname "Olivier"
Olivier (given name), a page for people with the given name "Olivier"
Olivier (disambiguation), a disambiguation page for "Olivier"

References

Masculine given names
English masculine given names
German masculine given names
Swedish masculine given names
Norwegian masculine given names
Danish masculine given names
Finnish masculine given names
Estonian masculine given names
Given names derived from plants or flowers
Catalan masculine given names
Serbian masculine given names
Croatian masculine given names
Macedonian masculine given names
Czech masculine given names
Slovak masculine given names